Jay Narayan Vyas (born 14 April 1947) is a politician, scholar, analyst, administrator and a public life official from Gujarat, India. He is a former Cabinet Minister of Government of Gujarat in charge of the Health and Family Welfare department from 2007 to 2012 during the Bharatiya Janata Party rule.

Education 
He received a degree in Civil Engineering from the Maharaja Sayajirao University of Baroda and a post graduate degree in Civil Engineering from Indian Institute of Technology Bombay. He also holds post graduate qualifications in Marketing Management and a degree in law.

Career
Vyas teamed up with Bakul Dholakia, former director of Indian Institute of Management Ahmedabad, and Mukesh Patel, a tax scholar and columnist, to present a post-budget discussion following the presentation of the union budget in the Parliament of India. The session conducted by this trio spans over three decades.

Bureaucratic career
Vyas is a water management expert. He headed the Sardar Sarovar Dam project as a Chairman responsible for its implementation. It was one of the largest multi-purpose water management projects in India. He also guided the implementation of this project later date as the Minister in charge of Sardar Sarovar and major irrigation projects.

Political career
Vyas has had a political career spanning over 20 years. He was elected to Gujarat Legislative Assembly in 2007 and became Cabinet Minister in Government of Gujarat in charge of Health & Family Welfare, Co-ordination of Voluntary Organisations, Non Resident Gujarati Division.

Vyas lost to Balvantsinh Rajput of Indian National Congress (INC) for the Siddhpur assembly seat in 2012 Gujarat legislative assembly election whom he had defeated in 2007. He lost again to INC candidate  Chandaji Thakor for Siddhpur in 2017 Gujarat legislative assembly election. He left BJP in November and joined INC in December 2022.

References

External links 
Gujarat Government Website
Jay Narayan Vyas Website

Living people
1947 births
Indian civil engineers
IIT Bombay alumni
State cabinet ministers of Gujarat
Gujarat MLAs 2007–2012
Bharatiya Janata Party politicians from Gujarat
Indian National Congress politicians from Gujarat
Former members of Bharatiya Janata Party
Maharaja Sayajirao University of Baroda alumni